The 2016 Claro Open Bucaramanga was a professional tennis tournament played on clay courts. It was the eighth edition of the tournament which was part of the 2016 ATP Challenger Tour. It took place in Bucaramanga, Colombia between 25 and 31 January 2016.

Singles main draw entrants

Seeds

 1 Rankings are as of January 18, 2016.

Other entrants
The following players received wildcards into the singles main draw:
  Nicolás Barrientos
  Alejandro Falla
  Tommy Paul
  Eduardo Struvay

The following players received entry as alternates:
  Guido Andreozzi
  Arthur De Greef

The following players received entry from the qualifying draw:
  Maximiliano Estévez
  Daniel Elahi Galán
  José Hernández
  Nicolás Jarry

Champions

Singles

 Gerald Melzer def.  Paolo Lorenzi 6–3, 6–1

Doubles

 Julio Peralta /  Horacio Zeballos def.  Sergio Galdós /  Luis David Martínez 6–2, 6–2

External links
Official Website

Claro Open Bucaramanga
Seguros Bolívar Open Bucaramanga
Claro Open Bucaramanga